Indian People's Forward Bloc is a political party in West Bengal, India. The party emerged through a split in the All India Forward Bloc. The party is led by Jayanta Roy, former AIFB Rajya Sabha member, and Chhaya Ghosh, former West Bengal Minister of Agriculture. Ahead of the 2006 legislative election, IPFB reached an alliance with the Indian National Congress, although no IPFB candidate got elected.

References

Political parties in West Bengal
2006 establishments in West Bengal
Political parties established in 2006